Hakea bucculenta, commonly known as red pokers, is a large shrub in the family Proteaceae endemic to Western Australia. A spectacular ornamental shrub with red or orange flowers that appear in rod-like blooms in leaf axils for an extended period from May to November.

Description
Smaller branches have irregular patches of flattened silky hairs becoming smooth at flowering. Each leaf has fine ribbing, conspicuous veins with an obvious mid-vein on both sides and ending with a sharp point. Flowers appear from May to November, the main flush in spring. The pedicel is smooth and perianth a bright red. The grey smooth fruit appear in clusters of 3–16 on a long stem or attached directly onto the branch. Each fruit is divided into a thick body ending a blunt beak.

Taxonomy
Hakea bucculenta was first formally described by the botanist Charles Austin Gardner in 1936  and published in the Journal of the Royal Society of Western Australia.
The specific epithet (bucculenta) is derived from the Latin word bucculentus meaning "with full cheeks", which refers to the shape of the fruit.

Distribution
Hakea bucculenta is endemic to coastal areas in the Gascoyne and Mid West regions between Shark Bay and Geraldton in Western Australia. Grows on coastal sand plain heath or mallee, roadsides verges in sandy, loam or clay-based soils.

Cultivation
Hakea bucculenta is sensitive to dieback and thus difficult to keep alive in areas of high humidity. It can be successfully grafted onto Hakea salicifolia.
It is most commonly propagated from seeds which germinate in about three to four weeks. Cuttings can also be used but usually have a low rate of success. It grows well in a sunny position out of the wind in well-drained soils; it will tolerate both drought and frost.

References

External links

Eudicots of Western Australia
bucculenta
Plants described in 1936